Hozier may refer to:

People
 Ambroise-Louis-Marie d'Hozier (1764–1846), last of the juges d'armes of France
 Charles-René d'Hozier (1640–1732), French historical commentator
 Henry Montague Hozier, secretary of Lloyd's and father of Clementine Churchill
 James Hozier, 2nd Baron Newlands (1851–1929), Scottish civil servant, diplomat and politician
 Louis-Pierre d'Hozier (1685–1767), juge d'armes of France
 Pierre d'Hozier (1592–1660), French genealogist
 William Hozier, 1st Baron Newlands (1825–1906), Scottish soldier and businessman
 Hozier (musician) (born 1990), Andrew Hozier-Byrne, Irish musician
 Hozier (album), his self-titled debut album

Other
 Hozier Islands, Nunavut, Canada
 Hozier baronets

See also
 Hojer (disambiguation)
 Hoosier (disambiguation)
 Hosier (disambiguation)